Flora Philip (19 May 1865 – 14 August 1943) was a Scottish mathematician, one of the first women to receive a degree from the University of Edinburgh and the first female member of the Edinburgh Mathematical Society.

Early life 
Flora Philip was born on 19 May 1865 in Tobermory, Mull to William Phillip, a civil engineer, and Isabella McDougall.

Education 
Philip attended at Tain Academy and then moved to Edinburgh in 1883 to continue her education. At the time, the law prevented women from studying at Scottish universities so she enrolled with the Edinburgh Association for the University Education of Women. In 1885 she was awarded the University of Edinburgh Certificate in Arts by University Principal Sir William Muir, for her studies in English literature, ethics, mathematics and physiology. 

In 1889 the Universities (Scotland) Act was passed allowing women to be admitted to Scottish universities for the first time. Philip matriculated at the University of Edinburgh and received her degree for her previous studies. On 13 April 1893 she and seven other women graduated from the University, becoming the first women to do so. A report on the graduation ceremony noted "a large attendance of the general public, many of whom were doubtless draw thither to witness the spectacle, seen for the first time in the history of this university, of ladies taking their places (one lady with distinction) among the graduates."

Philip trained to teach at St George's Training College for Women Teachers, and taught at the St George's High School for Girls in Edinburgh until her marriage in 1893.

Edinburgh Mathematical Society 
In December 1886 Philips became the first female member of the Edinburgh Mathematical Society despite not having a formal university degree. She withdrew her membership upon marriage in 1893, still the only woman member of the society.

Anniversary 
In 1943, the University of Edinburgh marked the fiftieth anniversary of that first group of women graduates, and three of eight attended the ceremony as honoured guests on the platform: Flora Philip, Maude Elizabeth Newbigin, Amelia Hutchison Stirling. Philip died later that year.

Personal life 
Philip married lawyer George Stewart in 1893. They had four children. She died in 1943 at a nursing home, aged 78 years, and is buried in Dean Cemetery.

References 

1865 births
1943 deaths
Scottish mathematicians
Alumni of the University of Edinburgh
Women mathematicians